2016 Regional League Division 2 North Eastern Region is the 8th season of the League competition since its establishment in 2009. It is in the third tier of the Thai football league system. The league winners and runners up will qualify for the 2016 Regional League Division 2 champions league round.

Changes from Last Season

Team Changes

Promoted Clubs

Khonkaen United and Ubon UMT United were promoted to the 2016 Thai Division 1 League.

Returning Clubs

Yasothon is returning to the league after a 2-year break.

Moved Clubs

Loei City and Nong Bua Pitchaya were moved to the Northern Region.
Chaiyaphum were moved to the Central Region.

Stadium and locations

League table

Results

Season statistics

Top scorers
As of 28 August 2016.

See also
 2016 Thai Premier League
 2016 Thai Division 1 League
 2016 Regional League Division 2
 2016 Thai FA Cup
 2016 Thai League Cup
 2016 Kor Royal Cup

References

External links
 Division 2
 Thai-Fussball

Regional League North-East Division seasons